Alfie Hewett (born 6 December 1997) is a British wheelchair tennis player. He is the former world No. 1 in singles and current world No. 1 in doubles.

Hewett is a 23-time major champion, having won seven titles in singles and 16 in doubles, the latter all partnering Gordon Reid. The pair completed the Grand Slam in 2021, becoming the first to do so in wheelchair men's doubles since Stéphane Houdet in 2014. Hewett is also a three-time Paralympic silver medalist, and won the Wheelchair Tennis Masters in both singles and doubles in 2017.

Hewett was born with a congenital heart defect that required surgery at six months, and also suffered from Legg–Calvé–Perthes disease, a condition that inhibits blood flow from the pelvis to the hip joint. His ability to walk has been severely impaired and he has been using a wheelchair since being six years old. Though able to walk, Hewett is not fully mobile in the conventional sense and cannot do able-bodied sports.

Tennis career

Hewett attended Acle High School and went on to study Sport and Exercise Science at City College Norwich.

In July 2016 Hewett won the 2016 Wimbledon Championships – Wheelchair men's doubles, alongside Gordon Reid, coming back from a set down to win against the French pair Stéphane Houdet and Nicolas Peifer.

He won a silver medal in the men's singles event at Rio 2016 and silver in the doubles event with partner Gordon Reid, who beat him in the singles final.

In May 2017 Hewett won his first Grand Slam in singles at the French Open, beating Gustavo Fernández of Argentina in three sets, despite losing the first to love.

In July 2017, in a repeat of the final a year earlier, Hewett won the 2017 Wimbledon Championships – Wheelchair men's doubles, alongside Reid, winning in three sets against Houdet and Peifer.

Hewett won the 2017 NEC Wheelchair Tennis Masters in Loughborough, UK. He ended 2017 ranked No 2 in the world, then a career-high.

On 29 January 2018 Hewett became the world number 1.

In March 2018 Hewett won his first Super Series singles title at the Cajun Classic in Baton Rouge, USA.

On 2 September 2018 he claimed his second Super Series title at the US Open USTA Wheelchair Championships in St. Louis. Later that month Hewett won the singles title at the US Open as well as the doubles title with Gordon Reid.

In September 2019 he successfully defended both his singles and, with Gordon Reid, doubles titles at the US Open.

In 2020 Hewett won the French Open singles title in three sets against Joachim Gérard and partnered Reid to win all three available Grand Slam doubles titles at the Australian Open, US Open and French Open, with the Wimbledon Championships cancelled due to the COVID-19 pandemic.

After winning a silver medal in the men's doubles with Gordon Reid at the 2020 Summer Paralympics and losing the bronze medal singles match to Reid, world number 2 Hewett spoke about his Paralympic future being "out of his hands", due to a review into whether his disability is severe enough to qualify him to play in a wheelchair under the 2019 revision of International Tennis Federation rules. Hewett was allowed to continue his tennis career after an alteration to the new ITF rules in November 2021.

Career Statistics

Grand Slam performance timelines

Wheelchair singles

Wheelchair doubles

Grand Slam tournament finals

Wheelchair singles: 13 (7 titles, 6 runner-ups)

Wheelchair doubles: 22 (16 titles, 6 runner-ups)

References

External links
 
 
 

1997 births
Living people
British male tennis players
British wheelchair tennis players
French Open champions
Wimbledon champions
US Open (tennis) champions
British disabled sportspeople
Paralympic wheelchair tennis players of Great Britain
Paralympic silver medalists for Great Britain
Paralympic medalists in wheelchair tennis
Wheelchair tennis players at the 2016 Summer Paralympics
Wheelchair tennis players at the 2020 Summer Paralympics
Medalists at the 2016 Summer Paralympics
Medalists at the 2020 Summer Paralympics
Tennis people from Norfolk
People educated at City College Norwich
People from Cantley, Norfolk
ITF number 1 ranked wheelchair tennis players